Frans Steenbergen (17 August 1920 – 6 July 1978) was a Dutch footballer. He played in two matches for the Netherlands national football team in 1949.

References

External links
 

1920 births
1978 deaths
Dutch footballers
Netherlands international footballers
Place of birth missing
Association footballers not categorized by position